Frank Carrington (September 13, 1893 – July 3, 1975) was the co-founder with Antoinette Scudder in 1938 of the Paper Mill Playhouse in Millburn, New Jersey, United States.

He had a sister, Gene Carrington, a resident of Millburn, near the Playhouse.

Legacy
The Frank Carrington Excellence in the Arts Award is given in his honor.

References

1893 births
1975 deaths
Place of birth missing
People from Millburn, New Jersey
American theatre managers and producers